James Reginald "Reggie" Morris (June 25, 1886 – February 16, 1928) was an American actor, director, and screenwriter of the silent era. He appeared in 46 films between 1913 and 1918. He also directed 40 films between 1917 and 1927. He was born in New Jersey and died in Los Angeles, California from a heart attack.

Selected filmography

 All for Science (1913)
 The Detective's Stratagem (1913)
 The Stopped Clock (1913)
 The Van Nostrand Tiara (1913)
 So Runs the Way (1913)
 The Law and His Son (1913)
 The Stolen Treaty (1913)
 A Social Cub (1916)
 Haystacks and Steeples (1916)
 The Danger Girl (1916)
 A Regular Fellow (1925 (screenplay)
 Hands Up! (1926) (story)
 Wet Paint (1926) (story)
 A Girl in Every Port (1928) (screenplay)

External links

1886 births
1928 deaths
Place of birth missing
American male film actors
American male silent film actors
American film directors
American male screenwriters
20th-century American male actors
20th-century American male writers
20th-century American screenwriters